Trubach is a river in Bavaria, Germany. It flows into the Wiesent near Pretzfeld.

See also
List of rivers of Bavaria

References

Rivers of Bavaria
Rivers of Germany